The Coon Creek Girls were a popular all-female "string band" in the Appalachian style of folk music (a precursor of country music) which began in the mid-1930s. Created (and named) by John Lair for his Renfro Valley Barn Dance show, the band originally consisted of sisters Lily May and Rosie Ledford (from Powell County, Kentucky) along with Esther "Violet" Koehler (from Indiana), Evelyn "Daisy" Lange (from Ohio) and Norma Madge Mullins (from Renfro Valley, Kentucky).

On June 8, 1939, when King George VI and Queen Elizabeth visited the White House of President Franklin D. Roosevelt, there were numerous musical acts, including Lawrence Tibbett, Marian Anderson, and Kate Smith. Also included were a troupe of Bascom Lunsford's square dancers and the Coon Creek Girls.

In 1979, John Lair revived the name with the New Coon Creek Girls, a combo which remained popular for several decades, despite numerous changes in line-up. Among the former members are Pamela Gadd and Pam Perry, who later became members of the country band Wild Rose.

In 2013, the original touring group of the New Coon Creek Girls from 1985-87 (Vicki Simmons, Pam Perry Combs, Wanda Barnett, and Pam Gadd) made the decision to reunite in order to fund speech therapy music camp for Simmons who underwent surgery for an aneurysm in 2008. As of 2014, Simmons has made an amazing recovery, and the band was still performing various reunion concerts.

References

External links
From the Internet Archive (www.archive.org):
Flowers Blooming In The Wildwood
Uncle Dudy (Keep Fiddlin' On) w/ Sowing On The Mountain

Musical groups established in 1937
Old-time bands
American bluegrass music groups
American country music groups
All-female bands
Vocalion Records artists